Michael John Basman (16 March 1946 – 26 October 2022) was an English chess player, chess author and International Master. He was awarded the International Master title in 1980. Basman was a prolific writer, who made many contributions to the field of chess openings, and was particularly known for frequently choosing bizarre or rarely played openings in his own games, including the St. George Defence (with which English Grandmaster Tony Miles once famously defeated the then World Champion Anatoly Karpov), the Grob (for Black and White) and also The Creepy Crawly, which is a3, then h3 followed by a quick c4. Possibly his greatest tournament success was when he tied for first place in the British Chess Championship tournament of 1973, although he lost the play-off match with William Hartston.

In 1975 England contested a match over ten boards against France in Luton. Basman played Board One, ahead of future super Grandmasters John Nunn and Jon Speelman.

Basman created the prestigious UK Chess Challenge, a tournament for juniors of all standards and ages progressing over four stages, now advertised as the biggest chess tournament in the world. Grandmaster Raymond Keene once wrote, referring to Basman's promotion of youth chess, "Michael Basman is in many ways the most important person in British chess."

Basman's father was an Armenian immigrant who changed the family name from Basmadjian. His family knew the singer Cleo Laine, who worked as a babysitter for the young Michael.

Basman died on 26 October 2022, at the age of 76, from cancer.

Illustrative games
Although Basman never attained the rank of grandmaster, he did beat several. He defeated grandmaster Jon Speelman with his 'Killer Grob' defence.

Politics
Basman ran as an Independent candidate in the constituency of Kingston and Surbiton at the 2017 general election. He finished last of seven candidates, with 100 votes (0.2%).

Books by Michael Basman

References

1946 births
2022 deaths
British chess players
English chess players
Chess International Masters
People from St Pancras, London
English male writers
British chess writers
British people of Armenian descent
Chess theoreticians
Independent British political candidates